William Hoyt may refer to:

 William Hoyt (athlete) (1875–1954), American pole vaulter
 William B. Hoyt (1937–1992), member of the New York State Assembly
 William Dana Hoyt (born 1880), phycologist with the botanical abbreviation "Hoyt"
 William Lloyd Hoyt (born 1930), Canadian lawyer and judge
 William R. Hoyt, state senator for South Carolina during the Reconstruction Era